Gregory Seevers (born September 7, 1965) is an American professional stock car racing driver. During his career, he was a longtime start and park driver for Norm Benning's ARCA Racing Series team until he closed it in 2009 when he moved full-time to the NASCAR Camping World Truck Series that year. He would then start and park in one Truck Series race for Benning in 2011, which was the last time he raced.

Motorsports career results

NASCAR
(key) (Bold – Pole position awarded by qualifying time. Italics – Pole position earned by points standings or practice time. * – Most laps led.)

Camping World Truck Series

ARCA Re/Max Series
(key) (Bold – Pole position awarded by qualifying time. Italics – Pole position earned by points standings or practice time. * – Most laps led.)

References

External links
 

1965 births
NASCAR drivers
ARCA Menards Series drivers
Living people
People from West Milton, Ohio
Racing drivers from Ohio